Gromadzice  is a village in the administrative district of Gmina Czarnożyły, within Wieluń County, Łódź Voivodeship, in central Poland.

The village has a population of 380.

References

Villages in Wieluń County